Pascal Bahuaud (born 15 June 1956) is a French rower. He competed in the men's coxless four event at the 1988 Summer Olympics.

References

1956 births
Living people
French male rowers
Olympic rowers of France
Rowers at the 1988 Summer Olympics
Place of birth missing (living people)